The Little Pamir (Wakhi: Wuch Pamir; Kyrgyz: Kichik Pamir) is a broad U-shaped grassy valley or pamir in the eastern part of the Wakhan in north-eastern Afghanistan. The valley is 100 km long and 10 km wide, and is bounded to the north by the Nicholas Range, a subrange of the Pamir Mountains.

Chaqmaqtin Lake (9 km by 2 km) lies towards the western end of the valley while the Tegerman Su valley lies at its easternmost end. The Aksu or Murghab River flows east from the lake through the Little Pamir to enter Tajikistan at the eastern end of the valley. The Bozai Darya (also known as the Little Pamir River) rises a short distance west of the lake, and flows 15 km west to join the Wakhjir River and form the Wakhan River near the settlement of Bozai Gumbaz.

The Little Pamir is used by semi-nomadic Kyrgyz herders for summer pasture. In the past the valley was part of the Principality of Wakhan. In 1978 almost all the inhabitants fled to Pakistan in the aftermath of the Saur Revolution. Many of the Kyrgyz subsequently migrated to Turkey, but in October 1979, following the Soviet occupation of Afghanistan, a group of about 200 Kyrgyz returned to the Little Pamir. In 2003 there were 140 yurt households.

The valley supports populations of Marco Polo sheep, ibex, and other wild animals. The naturalist George Schaller has advocated the creation of an international peace park to protect the wildlife in the area.

The Little Pamir is accessed by trails from the roadhead at Sarhad-e Broghil, about 5 days' walk away. A rough road also leads to the Little Pamir from Murghab in Tajikistan, and was the route by which the Soviets occupied the eastern part of Wakhan. The border is now closed. In 2000 the road was used to deliver humanitarian aid to the Kyrgyz of the Little Pamir, and in 2003 a trade fair was held at the border for a few hours.

During the late-2000s, due to lawlessness, the Kyrgyz in Afghanistan reported robbery and theft in Little Pamir by bandits from Tajikistan. 

In the late-2010s, a joint Chinese-Tajik-Afghan border patrol base was set up across the border on the Tajikistan side that remained secretive for a few years. Their joint patrol in Little Pamir using Chinese vehicles were spotted as early as 2016.

References 

Valleys of Afghanistan
Wakhan
Landforms of Badakhshan Province